MySims Racing is a go-kart-car racing game developed by Artificial Mind & Movement (now Behaviour Interactive) and published by Electronic Arts as part of the MySims series, a spin-off from its trademark The Sims series of games. The title was released on June 12, 2009, for the Nintendo DS and Wii.

Though similar to Mario Kart, the game offers some unique gameplay features, such as a Story Mode (similar to the rebooted Need for Speed series), basic car and character customization, and the ability to transfer cars to and from Wii Remotes.

Reception

The game received mixed reviews among critics. GameSpot gave the Wii version 7.5, praising the game's customization and new style of kart racing. The DS version received 7.0 from GameSpot. It was praised for its fun customization options, the Story mode that mixes up the standard kart-racing formula and its crisp, vibrant visuals both in and out of races; however felt the game's Story mode was too long.

References 

2009 video games
Electronic Arts games
Nintendo DS games
Kart racing video games
Racing video games
The Sims
Wii games
Wii Wheel games
Video games developed in Canada
Video games scored by Mark Mothersbaugh
Life simulation games
Social simulation video games
Behaviour Interactive games
Visceral Games
Multiplayer and single-player video games